United States Marine Forces Special Operations Command (MARSOC) is a component command of the United States Special Operations Command (SOCOM) that comprises the Marine Corps' contribution to SOCOM. Its core capabilities are direct action, special reconnaissance and foreign internal defense. MARSOC has also been directed to conduct counter-terrorism and information operations.

History and lineage

Its creation was announced on 23 November 2005 by U.S. Defense Secretary Donald Rumsfeld, following a meeting between him, the SOCOM commander General Bryan D. Brown, and the Marine Corps Commandant General Michael Hagee on 28 October 2005. MARSOC was officially activated on 24 February 2006 with ceremonies at Camp Lejeune, North Carolina.

The potential participation of the Marine Corps in SOCOM has been controversial since SOCOM was formed in 1986. At the time, Marine Corps leaders felt that their Force Reconnaissance (FORECON) units were best kept in the Marine Corps' Marine Air-Ground Task Force command structure and that the detachment of an elite Marine special operations unit would be to the detriment of the Marine Corps as a whole. A re-evaluation following the September 11 attacks and the Global War on Terrorism, along with new policy established by Secretary Rumsfeld and Commandant General James L. Jones at The Pentagon, caused the Marine Corps to work towards integration with SOCOM. The establishment of MARSOC represented the most significant step towards that goal and followed the establishment of Detachment One (Det One), a small Marine Corps detachment formed as a pilot program to test Marine Corps integration into SOCOM. It was made up of mostly Marines from 1st and 2nd Force Reconnaissance Batalions along with other hand-picked support men and served with Navy SEALs under Naval Special Warfare Group One. Det One conducted a multitude of special operations in Iraq alongside their special operations brothers of the sister services. SOCOM conducted a study of the unit's deployment, which clearly indicated success and strong performance. Det One was disbanded in 2006 soon after the creation of MARSOC. The first of many Marine Special Operations Companies stood up in June 2006.

MARSOC's initial deployment to Afghanistan in 2007 was mired in controversy when its Fox Company was sent back to the United States and its commander relieved from duty after a shooting incident. The incident that resulted in as many as 19 civilians killed involved a complex ambush by insurgents that included a suicide car bomb and small arms fire. Allegations later arose that the MARSOC operators killed the civilians while suppressing enemy fire, but these allegations proved false. MARSOC Marines also took part in Operation Enduring Freedom – Philippines.

Following U.S. Army General David Petraeus' assumption of command in Afghanistan in 2010, in support of the ALP/VSO program (Afghan Local Police/Village Stability Operations), special forces in Afghanistan were task-organized into battalion level SOTF (Special Operations Task Forces), each with a geographic area of responsibility—for MARSOC, this was western Afghanistan and Helmand Province. In March 2012, MARSOC teams suffered several casualties to Green on Blue attacks. In July 2012, a patrol of Afghan Army commandos was ambushed by insurgents from several buildings in Badghis Province and three Afghans were wounded by small arms fire. Gunnery Sergeants Jonathan Gifford and Daniel Price raced forward on an ATV to retrieve the wounded under direct fire from the enemy. After evacuating the wounded to an emergency helicopter landing zone, they returned and assaulted the enemy positions in a fierce close-quarter battle. While throwing grenades down the chimney of an insurgent-occupied building, they were struck and killed by PKM fire; for his actions that day Price was awarded the Silver Star.

On 6 August 2014, MARSOC claimed and officially bestowed the prestigious Marine Raider moniker upon their subordinate combat units (Marine Special Operations Regiment) in commemoration of the fabled and elite amphibious light infantry unit that operated during World War II. Marine Corps Times reported that in 2017, Marine Raiders assisted in the liberation of Marawi from ISIS militants. In February 2019, Marine Corps Times reported that since the formation of MARSOC 13 years before, it had conducted 300 operational deployments across 13 countries, awarded more than 300 valor awards and that 43 Raiders (including two military dogs) had been killed in training and combat operations.

Since MARSOC's first deployment, it has become a strong partner in SOCOM and proven itself able to conduct full-spectrum special operations. They have successfully conducted both long-term counterinsurgency under the VSO program and carried out complex direct action tasks.

Organization

The base unit of MARSOC is a fourteen-man Marine Special Operations Team (MSOT), commanded by a captain as team commander, assisted by a master sergeant as team chief. Each team has two identical squads, or tactical elements, each led by a gunnery sergeant as element leader. MARSOC is based at Camp Lejeune, North Carolina, and is split into three subordinate commands:

Selection

Prerequisites
All Marines are screened to ensure that the Marines joining MARSOC meet the established prerequisites for duty within the command.
 Have a minimum GT score of 105, 110 for officers.
 Have a minimum PFT of 235.
 Be able to pass the MARSOC swim assessment.
 Meet the MARSOC medical screening criteria.
 Be eligible to obtain and maintain a secret clearance.

Screening
Selection of the right personnel begins with a rigorous screening process designed to identify the right Marines for the right billet within MARSOC. Operational billets are open to females as of 2016. Screening takes place in 3 stages: record screening, physical screening, and a psychological and medical evaluation.

Special Operations Training Course
The Special Operations Training Course (SOTC) is six weeks of unhindered, realistic, challenging basic and intermediate Special Operations Forces (SOF) warfighting skills training. During STC, the Special Operations Capabilities Specialists will also attend Survival, Evasion, Resistance and Escape (SERE) training along with a MARSOF Level 1 Course specific to their MOS: Explosive Ordnance Disposal (6 weeks), Communications (12 weeks), Intelligence (14–17 weeks), Joint Terminal Attack Controller (4 weeks), Multi-Purpose Canine (10 weeks).

Personnel

Critical Skills Operators (CSOs) are the primary special operations Marines within MARSOC. They are trained to execute a variety of missions. Specialized training also provides capabilities in language fluency necessary for crossing cultural barriers, allowing CSOs to connect with the local forces as well as civilians. Marines designated CSOs are awarded MOS code 0372. CSOs are assigned to Marine Special Operations Teams (MSOT), Companies (MSOC), and Battalions (MSOB).

Special Operations Officers (SOOs) are Marine Corps officers awarded the MOS code 0370. Officer candidates trying to obtain this MOS have to be rank of first lieutenant or higher and must go through similar training and more compared to enlistees. SOO candidates will attend Assessment & Selection (A&S) Phase 1 and 2 together with their enlisted counterparts. Upon successful A&S Phase 1 and 2 completion, Marines selected for assignment as CSOs or SOOs attend Individual Training Course (ITC). Officers attending ITC will also attend MARSOC Team Commander's Course (MTCC), which coincides with ITC. Once all training has been completed, SOOs will be sent to their Marine Special Operations Teams, Companies, and Battalions.

Special Operations Combat Service Specialists (SOCS-Ss) are combat service support Marines who serve one standard tour with MARSOC in their primary MOS. Their training includes core skills for joint and interagency work as well as enhanced SOF combat skills training to enable their successful integration and survivability in special operations environments.

Special Operations Capabilities Specialists (SOCSs) are combat support Marines who are able to join MARSOC based upon their MOS skill. They receive advanced special operations forces training and certification. SOCSs are operational and tactical force multipliers and frequently deploy alongside CSOs. SOCS billet fields include intelligence, communications, explosive ordnance disposal, dog handlers, and fire-control specialists. SOCSs are awarded the MOS of 8071 and return to the operating forces after an extended tour of service with MARSOC.

Insignia

In August 2016, the Marine Corps approved a new Marine Special Operator Insignia for wear by graduates of the five-phase Individual Training Course (ITC). The pin device will first be issued to the next ITC graduating class of critical skills operators. Critical skills operators and special operations officers already in the field will receive their pins later.

List of commanders
 Command of MARSOC is a Major General's billet
 Dennis Hejlik – February 2006 – April 2008
 Mastin M. Robeson – April 2008 – November 2009
 Paul E. Lefebvre – November 2009 – August 2012
 Mark A. Clark – August 2012 – August 2014
 Joseph Osterman – August 2014 – August 2016
 Carl E. Mundy III August 2016 – June 2018
 Daniel Yoo – June 2018 – June 2020
 James F. Glynn – June 2020 – May 2022
 Matthew G. Trollinger – May 2022 – present

Gallery

See also

 Air Force Special Operations Command
 Joint Special Operations Command
 Organization of the United States Marine Corps
 United States Army Special Operations Command
 Ground Mobility Vehicle – (US)SOCOM program

References

 Attribution

Works cited

External links

 Marine Forces Special Operations Command official website
 2013 SOCOM Factbook
 ShadowSpear Special Operations: MARSOC
 MARSOC Prerequisites and Recruitment Phases Archived
 U.S. Marine Raider Legacy at the Marine Raider Foundation

Commands of the United States Marine Corps
Special operations units and formations of the United States Marine Corps